The Heinkel He 72 Kadett ("Cadet") was a German single-engine biplane trainer of the 1930s.

Development
The Kadett was designed in 1933 to meet an official requirement for a basic trainer. It was a single-bay biplane of fabric-covered, metal construction with open cockpits, a staggered wing, a strut-braced tail unit, and fixed tailskid undercarriage. The prototype was powered by a 104 kW (139 hp) Argus As 8B air-cooled inline engine.

The first production model, the He 72A retained the As 8B engine in early batches, but later production aircraft had a 112 kW  (150 hp) As 8R. The He 72A was superseded by the He 72B, which was the major production version. This was powered by a 120 kW (160 bhp) Siemens-Halske Sh 14A radial.

The He 72B was produced as the He 72B-1 landplane and He 72BW Seekadett ("Sea Cadet") twin-float seaplane. The civil development was the He 72B-3 Edelkadett ("Noble Cadet").

Operational history
The Kadett entered service with National Socialist Flyers Corps before the formation of the Luftwaffe. Later, it became a standard basic trainer with the Luftwaffe. Slovak forces used it in the attack role.

Variants
He 72A Kadett : Initial production version.
He 72B :
He 72B-1 :
He 72B-3 Edelkadett : Civil adaptation of He 72B-1. 30 built.
He 72BW Seekadett :  Twin-float seaplane. Prototype only.
He 172 - He 72B with NACA cowling. Prototype only in 1934.

Operators

Bulgarian Air Force

Czechoslovakian Air Force (Postwar)

National Socialist Flyers Corps
Luftwaffe

Imperial Japanese Navy - one aircraft 

Slovenské vzdušné zbrane
Slovak Insurgent Air Force

Specifications (He 72B)

See also

References

Further reading

 

1930s German military trainer aircraft
Biplanes
He 072
Single-engined tractor aircraft